The Šumava is an old breed of chicken originating in the Bohemian forest in the Czech Republic. Original Šumava chickens became extinct, but in the second half of 20th century, the breed was restored by crossing a few remaining animals from the original population with Czech gold brindle chicken, yellow Plymouth Rock, Rhode Island, New Hampshire and Wyandotte.

References

External links

Chicken breeds originating in the Czech Republic
Chicken breeds